Andrian Kordon (born 24 May 1977) is an Israeli judoka.

Achievements

References

External links
 
 

1977 births
Living people
Israeli male judoka
21st-century Israeli people